

Rugby sevens
International competitions
 January 5 – 13: 2019 Sudamérica Rugby Sevens in  Punta Del Este &  Viña del Mar
 Punta Del Este Sevens:  defeated , 7−5.
 Viña del Mar Sevens:  defeated , 31–7.

2018–19 World Rugby Sevens Series
 November 30 & December 1, 2018: WRSS #1 in  Dubai
 Cup: ; Plate: ; Bowl: ; Shield: 
 December 8 & 9, 2018: WRSS #2 in  Cape Town
 Cup: ; Plate: ; Bowl: ; Shield: 
 January 26 & 27: WRSS #3 in  Hamilton
 Cup: ; Plate: ; Bowl: ; Shield: 
 February 2 & 3: WRSS #4 in  Sydney
 Cup: ; Plate: ; Bowl: ; Shield: 
 March 1 – 3: WRSS #5 in  Las Vegas
 Cup: ; Plate: ; Bowl: ; Shield: 
 March 9 & 10: WRSS #6 in  Vancouver
 Cup: ; Plate: ; Bowl: ; Shield: 
 April 5 – 7: WRSS #7 in  Hong Kong
 Cup: ; Plate: ; Bowl: ; Shield: 
 April 13 & 14: WRSS #8 in  Singapore
 Cup: ; Plate: ; Bowl: ; Shield: 
 May 25 & 26: WRSS #9 in  London
 Cup: ; Plate: ; Bowl: ; Shield: 
 June 1 & 2: WRSS #10 (final) in  Paris
 Cup: ; Plate: ; Bowl: ; Shield:

2018–19 World Rugby Women's Sevens Series
 October 20 & 21, 2018: WRWSS #1 in  Glendale
 Cup: ; Plate: ; Bowl: 
 November 29 & 30, 2018: WRWSS #2 in  Dubai
 Cup: ; Plate: ; Bowl: 
 February 1 – 3: WRWSS #3 in  Sydney
 Cup: ; Plate: ; Bowl: 
 April 20 & 21: WRWSS #4 in  Kitakyushu
 Cup: ; Plate: ; Bowl: 
 May 11 & 12: WRWSS #5 in  Langford
 Cup: ; Plate: ; Bowl: 
 June 15 & 16: WRWSS #6 (final) in  Biarritz
 Cup: ; Plate: ; Bowl:

Rugby union

National teams
 September 28, 2018 – June 15, 2019: ///// 2018–19 Rugby Europe Trophy
 Final Ranking: 1. , 2. , 3. , 4. , 5. , 6. 
 October 13, 2018 – June 1, 2019: 2018–19 Rugby Europe Conference
 Conference 1 North Final Ranking: 1. , 2. , 3. , 4. , 5. 
 Conference 1 South Final Ranking: 1. , 2. , 3. , 4. , 5. 
 Conference 2 North Final Ranking: 1. , 2. , 3. , 4. , 5. 
 Conference 2 South Final Ranking: 1. , 2. , 3. , 4. , 5. 
 February 1 – March 15: ///// 2019 Six Nations Under 20s Championship
 Champions: ; Second: ; Third: ; Fourth: ; Fifth: ; Sixth: 
 February 1 – March 16: ///// 2019 Six Nations Championship
 Champions: ; Second: ; Third: ; Fourth: ; Fifth: ; Sixth: 
 February 1 – March 17: ///// 2019 Women's Six Nations Championship
 Champions: ; Second: ; Third: ; Fourth: ; Fifth: ; Sixth: 
 February 2 – March 9: ///// 2019 Americas Rugby Championship
 Champions: ; Second: ; Third: ; Fourth: ; Fifth: ; Sixth: 
 February 9 – March 17: ///// 2019 Rugby Europe Championship
 Champions: ; Second: ; Third: ; Fourth: ; Fifth: ; Sixth: 
 May 18 – June 29: // 2019 Asia Rugby Championship
 Champions: ; Second: ; Third: 
 June 4 – 22:  2019 World Rugby Under 20 Championship
  defeated , 24–23, to win their second consecutive World Rugby Under 20 Championship title.
  took third place.
 June 29 – September 21: /// 2019 Victoria Cup
 Champions: ; Second: ; Third: ; Fourth: 
 July 20 – August 10: /// 2019 Rugby Championship
 Champions: ; Second: ; Third: ; Fourth: 
 July 28 – August 3: // 2019 West African Series
 Champions: ; Second: ; Third: 
 September 20 – November 2: 2019 Rugby World Cup in 
  defeated , 32–12, to win their third Rugby World Cup title.
  took third place.

Club teams
 August 31, 2018 – May 25, 2019: //// 2018–19 Pro14
  Leinster defeated  Glasgow Warriors, 18–15, to win their second consecutive and sixth overall Pro14 title.
 August 31, 2018 – June 1, 2019:  2018–19 Gallagher Premiership
  Saracens F.C. defeated fellow English team, Exeter Chiefs, 37–34, to win their second consecutive and fifth overall Premiership Rugby title.
 October 12, 2018 – May 10, 2019: 2018–19 European Rugby Challenge Cup (final in Newcastle)
  Clermont defeated fellow French team, La Rochelle, 36–16, to win their third European Rugby Challenge Cup title.
 October 12, 2018 – May 11, 2019: 2018–19 European Rugby Champions Cup (final in Newcastle)
  Saracens F.C. defeated  Leinster, 20–10, to win their third European Rugby Champions Cup title.
 October 13, 2018 – May 10, 2019: 2018–19 European Rugby Continental Shield
 Both  Enisey-STM and  Calvisano have qualified to compete at the 2019–20 European Rugby Challenge Cup.
 The Ealing Trailfinders defeated the London Irish, 23–17, to win the inaugural RFU Championship Cup title.
 January 26 – June 16: / 2019 Major League Rugby season
 The  Seattle Seawolves defeated a fellow American team, the San Diego Legion, 26–23, to win their second consecutive Major League Rugby title.
 February 14 – July 5: //// 2019 Super Rugby season
 The  Crusaders defeated the  Jaguares, 19–3, to win their third consecutive and tenth overall Super Rugby championship title.
 August 31 – October 26: / 2019 National Rugby Championship
 The Western Force defeated the Canberra Vikings, 41–3, to win their first National Rugby Championship title.

See also
2019 in sports

References

External links
 World Rugby Official Site

 
Years of the 21st century in rugby union
2019 sport-related lists